The 1996–97 Mighty Ducks of Anaheim season was the fourth season in franchise history. The team qualified for the Stanley Cup playoffs for the first time in franchise history.

Offseason

Forward Paul Kariya was named team captain, following the retirement of defenseman Randy Ladouceur.

The Ducks only made one trade in the summer as the team looked good enough for the future following last season's late run, trading Mike Maneluk to the Ottawa Senators for Kevin Brown on July 1st. Just before the season started Anaheim made another deal with Ottawa, trading Shaun Van Allen and Jason York in exchange for Ted Drury and Marc Moro.

Regular season

The previous season of 1995-96 the Mighty Ducks of Anaheim had just narrowly missed the playoffs after being in the chase for the first time. The team put together a run of 12-4-3 over the final two months of the season to finish even with the Winnipeg Jets at 78 points in the standings, but the Jets earned the final spot thanks to having one more win.

So the Mighty Ducks start to the 96–97 season with a month of October that saw the team go 1-9-2 including an eight-game losing streak was a huge disappointment to say the least. Anaheim was held to two or fewer goals eight times during the stretch, and the two times they exploded for six goals in a game they ended up having to settle for a tie.

With all of four points through the first month, Anaheim was bottom of the Pacific Division and the Western Conference. The division-leading Colorado Avalanche were 11 points clear, and the Los Angeles Kings held the eighth and final playoff spot six point clear of the Mighty Ducks. Over the course of the rest of the season three teams, including Anaheim, would unseat the teams in playoff positioning in the West after the first month.

The combination of Teemu Selanne and Paul Kariya was synonymous with the Mighty Ducks of the mid-late 1990s, so lacking one half of that dynamic duo at the start of the season was a major issue. Kariya missed the first 11 games of the campaign with a pulled abdominal muscle, contributing greatly the Anaheim offensive woes.

Selanne lead the team in scoring through the first month with six goals and seven assists in the 12 games, with Kevin Todd in second with four goals and seven assists. Veteran Jari Kurri, signed in the offseason from the Rangers, contributed as well with three goals and four assists, while on the backend Roman Oksiuta chipped in three goals and five assists and Fredrik Olausson had two goals and three assists.

The lack of scoring punch affected the defense as well. For the full season Anaheim averaged 28.4 shots per game while allowing 32.7, yet during the opening month the Mighty Ducks put 26.8 shots on goal per game while allowing 32.5. Anaheim averaged 2.3 goals per game during October, well below their eventual season average of 3.0, while surrendering 4.2 against per game. Goalie Guy Hebert struggled as well, posting a .874 save percentage amidst the lack of support.

Anaheim didn't immediately vault up the standings with Kariya returning to the lineup in November, but the play stabilized and the team wouldn't lose more than three straight (which happened only twice) with Kariya and Selanne reunited. The offense kicked in to gear, with the Mighty Ducks averaging 3.3 goals per game in November and 3.7 goals per game in December.

By the time the All Star break rolled around Anaheim had pulled its season record up to 17-22-5, and Selanne, Kariya, and Hebert were all named to the Western Conference All Star team, giving the Mighty Ducks their first season with multiple All Star Game representatives. Selanne posted 25 goals and 31 assists in all 44 of the Mighty Ducks' games, while Kariya had 16 goals and 28 assists in 31 games. Hebert recovered as well, backstopping Anaheim to a 13-9-3 mark in his 26 starts following October with a .928 SV% and four shutouts during the span.

In the three months that followed the abysmal opening one, the Mighty Ducks didn't immediately vault upwards standings-wise, but they began winning more than they were losing. A 6-5-2 November was built upon with a 6-5-1 December. January saw Anaheim post a 7-5-1 mark before a 6-6-1 February. With two months left in the season the Mighty Ducks sat at 26-30-7, but were primed to make their big run.

After a 3–1 loss at the Great Western Forum to Los Angeles on February 20, Anaheim began its best run of form for the season. The Mighty Ducks picked up points in 12 consecutive games, going 7-0-5 from February 22 to March 19, winning five and tying three against eventual playoff qualifiers during the stretch. Selanne and Kariya again lead the way, Selanne with 11 goals and eight assists while Kariya posted seven goals and 10 assists.

Yet Anaheim also saw significant contributions from Steve Rucchin with two goals and nine assists, Joe Sacco's two goals and six assists, and Ted Drury potting four goals and dishing two assists. The defense chipped in with Dmitri Mironov scoring three goals and adding eight assists, while Darren Van Impe had two goals and five assists. Hebert was lights-out as well, appearing in every game during the streak with a .946 SV%, and had nine games with more than 30 saves and two with more than 40.

The Mighty Ducks closed the season out with another unbeaten streak, going 5-0-2 over the final seven games. From February 22 on Anaheim went a league-best 13-3-7 to help the team sew up its first winning record, first playoff berth, and home ice against the Phoenix Coyotes in the first round. Selanne finished second in the league with 51 goals and second with 109 points, while Kariya earned Lady Byng honors with 99 points in 69 games while taking just three minor penalties.

Final standings

Schedule and results

Playoffs

The Mighty Ducks qualified for the playoffs for the first time. Anaheim beat Phoenix 4–3 in the 1st round but was swept in the 2nd round by Detroit 4–0.

Mighty Ducks of Anaheim 4, Phoenix Coyotes 3

Detroit Red Wings 4, Mighty Ducks of Anaheim 0

Player statistics

Skaters

Goaltending

† Denotes player spent time with another team before joining the Mighty Ducks. Stats reflect time with the Mighty Ducks only.
‡ Denotes player was traded mid-season. Stats reflect time with the Mighty Ducks only.

Awards and records

Awards
 Paul Kariya – Lady Byng Memorial Trophy

Records
 Teemu Selanne – most points in a season (109)
 Paul Kariya – most plus/minus in a season (+36)
 Guy Hebert – most ties in a season (12)
 Guy Hebert – most shots against in a season (2133)

Transactions

Draft picks

Notes
 The Mighty Ducks acquired this pick as the result of a trade on July 8, 1995 that sent St. Louis' sixth-round pick in 1995 back to St. Louis in exchange for this pick.
 The Mighty Ducks third-round pick went to the Phoenix Coyotes (formerly the Winnipeg Jets) as the result of a trade on February 27, 1996 that sent Teemu Selanne, Marc Chouinard and a fourth-round pick in 1996 (92nd overall) to Anaheim in exchange for Chad Kilger, Oleg Tverdovsky and this pick (62nd overall).
 The Mighty Ducks fourth-round pick went to the Dallas Stars as the result of a trade on June 22, 1996 that sent a third-round pick in 1996 (58th overall) to Washington in exchange for a third-round pick in 1996 (70th overall) and this pick (90th overall).
Washington previously acquired this pick as the result of a trade on February 2, 1995 that sent Todd Krygier to Anaheim in exchange for this pick.
 The Mighty Ducks sixth-round pick went to the Detroit Red Wings as the result of a trade on April 4, 1995 that sent Mike Sillinger and Jason York to Anaheim in exchange for Stu Grimson, Mark Ferner and this pick (144th overall).

See also 
1996–97 NHL season

References

Anaheim Ducks seasons
A
A
Mighty Ducks of Anaheim
Mighty Ducks of Anaheim